Mark Sullivan is an American football coach. He is the defensive coordinator for the Fitchburg State Falcons football team.  Sullivan served as the head football coach at Framingham State University from 2002 to 2006, compiling a record of 4–41.

Head coaching record

College

Notes

References

External links
 Fitchburg State profile
 Nichols profile

Year of birth missing (living people)
Living people
Fitchburg State Falcons football coaches
Framingham State Rams football coaches
Nichols Bison football coaches
UMass Lowell River Hawks football coaches
UMass Minutemen football players
Worcester State Lancers football coaches
High school football coaches in Massachusetts